"En la Ciudad de la Furia" (Spanish for In the city of fury) is a song from the Argentine rock band Soda Stereo, written by lead vocalist and guitarist Gustavo Cerati.  It was released in 1989 as the first single from their 1988 album Doble Vida. The music video released in 1989 was a finalist in the MTV Video Music Awards.

Lyrics
The lyrics tells of a winged man, who is alone with himself, flying at night between the buildings "falling as a bird of prey", connected to "the city of fury" and is among many other winged men like him ("yo soy parte de todos" ("I am part of all")), who are susceptible, with their faces marked with a "destiny of fury".

The chorus refers to the arrival of day and the rest of the winged man, when "the city of fury" let him sleep between her legs (an image powerfully sensual) and hide in the fog.

Music
The music style can be described as an alternative/gothic rock sound with some new wave elements and shows the new sound that the band had adopted, changing from their previous albums. This song is a "harbinger" of the sound that the band was about to adopt as its own, especially alternative rock, the style in which this song was performed.

The song starts with a riff that Gustavo Cerati created when he was 14 years old. When Cerati begins to sing, the guitar stops, and the drums are alone with the bass guitar so that it makes a strong chord. After a while, the riff comes back.

Music video
The music video, which was directed by Alfredo Lois, was photographed in ambient black and white. Filmed in Buenos Aires, Argentina (that appears to be "the city of fury" mentioned in the lyrics) shows several downtown areas and buildings and people moving in that landscape.

The story revolves around an ordinary man who walks among the crowd, plagued by the conflicts created by urban life. This man is shown locked in a cage as a metaphor for being unable to escape from his issues. At the end of the video the locked up man turns out to be Cerati, then the full band appears, all playing in the same cage.

Notable live performances
The song has been played in most of the concerts by the band. One of the most significant performances was as the opening song of the last concert (El Último Concierto) by Soda Stereo on September 20, 1997, having a strong, distinctive final guitar solo.

In the presentation at the MTV studios in Miami on September 25, 1996, recorded as the live album Comfort y Música Para Volar, the band completely changed the original version, with a blues style, being much slower and complex musically. This performance had Colombian singer Andrea Echeverri as a guest singer in the chorus.

In the extensive Gira Me Verás Volver of 2007 (You'll See Me Come Back tour), in which the band reunited after 10 years of not playing together, this song was performed at every concert.

Remix version
A remix version is included in the remix album Zona de Promesas, called "En la Ciudad de la Furia [Dance Mix]".

References

External links
 "Doble Vida", AllMusic.com

Soda Stereo songs
1988 songs
1989 singles
Songs written by Gustavo Cerati